Mary Emily Gonsalves was a Roman Catholic nun from Karachi, Pakistan.

Early life
She was born in Mangalore, India in 1919. She started her teaching career in a school in Byculla, Bombay in 1940. In 1944 she joined the Daughters of the Cross religious congregation. She went on to do a master's degree in English and Economics. She taught in a college in Calcutta before she moved to Pakistan in 1957.

Career 
From 1972 to 1982 Sister Mary Emily was the Principal of the St. Joseph's College (Karachi), Pakistan. St. Joseph's is one of Pakistan's leading Colleges. In 2007, 1,548 students were studying in the college with a total of 78 teachers.

In 2005, when St. Joseph's College was returned to the Catholic Board of Education Sr Emily was again appointed principal.

On 23 March 2009 the Government of Pakistan awarded Sr. Emily the Sitara-e-Imtiaz, which she received  from the Governor of Sindh. This was in recognition of her services to education.

Sr. Emily died in Karachi on 9 January 2017. Her funeral was held at Saint Patrick's Cathedral, Karachi on January 10, 2017.

References

20th-century Pakistani Roman Catholic nuns
Recipients of Sitara-i-Imtiaz
Pakistani educators
2017 deaths
Pakistani people of Mangalorean descent
Pakistani Roman Catholic missionaries
Roman Catholic missionaries in Pakistan
Missionary educators
1919 births
Academics from Karachi
Women heads of universities and colleges
21st-century Pakistani Roman Catholic nuns